Michael Ilgner (born 1 May 1971) is a German former water polo player. He competed in the men's tournament at the 1996 Summer Olympics.

References

External links
 

1971 births
Living people
German male water polo players
Olympic water polo players of Germany
Water polo players at the 1996 Summer Olympics
People from Schweinfurt (district)
Sportspeople from Lower Franconia